Ivan Angelakov (born 24 March 1904, date of death unknown) was a Bulgarian cross-country skier. He competed in the men's 18 kilometre event at the 1936 Winter Olympics.

References

External links
 

1904 births
Year of death missing
Bulgarian male cross-country skiers
Olympic cross-country skiers of Bulgaria
Cross-country skiers at the 1936 Winter Olympics
Place of birth missing